USCGC Southwind (WAGB-280) was a  that served in the United States Coast Guard as USCGC Southwind (WAG-280), the Soviet Navy as the Admiral Makarov, the United States Navy as USS Atka (AGB-3) and again in the U.S. Coast Guard as USCGC Southwind (WAGB-280).

Construction
Her keel was laid on 20 July 1942 at the Western Pipe and Steel Company shipyards in San Pedro, California, she was christened by Mrs. Ona Jones and launched on 8 March 1943, and commissioned on 15 July 1944.

Her hull was of unprecedented strength and structural integrity, with a relatively short length in proportion to the great power developed, a cut away forefoot, rounded bottom, and fore, aft and side heeling tanks. Diesel electric machinery was chosen for its controllability and resistance to damage.

Southwind, along with the other Wind-class icebreakers, was heavily armed for an icebreaker due to her design being crafted during World War II. Her main battery consisted of two twin-mount  deck guns. Her anti-aircraft weaponry consisted of three quad-mounted Bofors 40 mm anti-aircraft autocannons and six Oerlikon 20 mm autocannons. She also carried six K-gun depth charge projectors and a Hedgehog as anti-submarine weapons. After her return from Soviet service she had a single 5"/38 caliber gun mount forward and a helicopter deck aft. In 1968 the forward mount was removed.

First U.S. Coast Guard service
On 15 July 1944, she was commissioned as USCGC Southwind (WAG-280).

Soviet service
The ship served in the Soviet merchant marine under the name Admiral Makarov (named in honor of Stepan Makarov) until being returned to the U.S. Navy on 28 December 1949 at Yokosuka, Japan.

U.S. Navy service
In 1950 the ship was transferred to the U.S. Navy and rechristened as USS Atka (AGB-3), after the small Aleutian island of Atka. Upon arrival at her home port of Boston, Atka entered the Boston Naval Shipyard for a thorough overhaul and modernization. The work was completed late in May 1951, and Atka began operations from Boston, Massachusetts in July 1951.

Throughout her career in the American navy, the icebreaker followed a routine established by the changing seasons. In the late spring, she would set sail for either the northern or southern polar regions to resupply American and Canadian air bases and weather and radar stations. In early fall, she would return to Boston for upkeep and repairs. In the winter, the ship would sail various routes in the North Atlantic Ocean to gather weather data before returning to Boston in early spring for repairs and preparation for her annual polar expedition.

The ship often carried civilian scientists who plotted data on ocean currents and ocean water characteristics. They also assembled hydrographic data on the poorly charted polar regions. Atka was also involved in numerous tests of cold weather equipment and survival techniques.

She served in the Atlantic fleet and completed three Arctic tours.

Atka conducted a notable expeditionary cruise to Antarctica for Operation Deep Freeze, scouting locations for science stations in support of the International Geophysical Year. She departed Boston on 1 December 1954, and after stops at Rodman Naval Station and Wellington, she sighted Scott Island and first ice on 12 January 1955, and encountered the Ross Ice Barrier on 14 January, marking her arrival at the continent. Atka conducted surveys, samplings, and experiments from the Ross Sea eastward to Princess Martha Coast until she departed the region on 19 February 1955. After stops at Buenos Aires and Rio de Janeiro, Atka returned to Boston on 12 April 1955, completing her mission.

Second U.S. Coast Guard service
On 31 October 1966 she was transferred to the United States Coast Guard and christened again as USCGC Southwind (WAGB-280), changed homeport to the United States Coast Guard Yard at Curtis Bay, Baltimore, Maryland.

After a shakedown cruise to Bermuda she proceeded on its first operational cruise north to Thule, Greenland.

She deployed to the Arctic in 1967, 1969, 1970, 1971, 1972 and 1973, as well as to the Antarctic in December 1967, December 1968 and January 1972. In 1968 she was involved in a diplomatic incident between Chile and Argentine about navigation rights in the Beagle channel.

In September 1970, Southwind visited the port of Murmansk, being the first U.S. naval vessel to visit a Soviet port since the start of the cold war. During that visit, she took aboard a boilerplate (BP-1227) from the Apollo program. The boilerplate had been lost in the North Sea in early 1970, recovered by a Soviet fishing trawler in the Bay of Biscay, transferred to the Soviet Union, and passed to Southwind on 5 September 1970.

Southwind was decommissioned on 31 May 1974, and sold for scrap on 17 March 1976 for $231,079.00 to Union Mineral & Alloy Corporation of New York.

References

External links

 USCGC Southwind
 USS Atka Association
 Icebreakers: Historic Photo Gallery by the U.S. Coast Guard
 "Arctic Combat: The Capture of the German Naval Auxiliary Externsteine by the Coast Guard Icebreakers Eastwind & Southwind in Greenland, 1944" by the U.S. Coast Guard
 United States Coast Guard, Historian's Office. United States Coast Guard. U.S. Department of Homeland Security.  Accessed 20 DEC 2021.

Wind-class icebreakers
Ships built in Los Angeles
1943 ships
Soviet Union–United States relations
Ships transferred from the United States Navy to the Soviet Navy
Ships transferred from the United States Navy to the United States Coast Guard